Witchcraft IV: The Virgin Heart is a 1992 American horror film directed by James Merendino and starring Charles Solomon Jr and Julie Strain. The fourth film in the Witchcraft series, it was followed by Witchcraft V: Dance with the Devil. Produced by Vista Street Entertainment, it was released by Troma Studios.

Plot

Will Spanner (Charles Solomon) is the son of a powerful warlock whose parents died. Spanner is reluctant to use his inherited powers, as he attempts to have a normal life as a defense attorney. Spanner is himself a powerful warlock, although he fears that the use of his powers will lead him to submit to his dark side.

Spanner defends Peter Wild who is accused of killing his girlfriend,  and after meeting and becoming enamored with Belladonna (Julie Strain) at a strip club, Spanner begins to investigate the case himself. The girlfriend was actually killed by a crazed killer with links to a music club. Belladonna also works at the music club, where musicians are selling their souls to club owner Sanatana in return for promised fame. Santana hides that he is the son of Satan. Santana is Belladonna's agent, and while she has not sold her soul, she is being held captive. Also assisting Spanner in his investigation is the sister of the accused killer, Lily Wild.

Cast
 Charles Solomon as William Spanner 
 Julie Strain as Belladonna
 Clive Pearson as Santana
 Lisa Jay Harrington as Lily Wild
 Jason O’Gulihur as Hal
 Erol Landis as Lt. Erol Munuz
 Orien Richman as  Pete Wild

Continuity

Spanner is now an attorney with a private practice. He mentions that his previous involvement with a case involving the supernatural was about three years ago. Spanner provides a voice-over narration, which is unique in the series. Witchcraft IV: The Virgin Heart is the last film in which Solomon portrays Spanner. He is played by Marklen Kennedy in Witchcraft V: Dance with the Devil, the next film in the series.  The name of the club is Coven, which Spanner states he has heard of before. One character claims to have been Spanner's brother in a previous life, but this does not appear to have been followed up in later films.

Production

Directed by James Merendino, written by Michael Paul Girand and Merendino. Released directly to video.

Reviews

TV Guide found the film neither sexy nor scary, but instead a pedestrian mystery that is badly scripted even by low-budget standards. AV Film club found the film to have many similarities with Blue Velvet and that it was a mix of film noir and horror, but noted that the dialogue was poorly written. For It's Man's Number, while fining Strain's inclusion a positive, but had little good else  to say about the film, stating "There's no sign of competence here in any department. Script and direction are awful, this is one ugly film in terms of the sheer murkiness of the visuals and audio, the acting is laughably bad at times, and it's impossible to care about the events." As of March 2018, the film has a 7% freshness rating on Rotten Tomatoes. In Creature Feature, the film was given three out of five stars.

Home release
The film has been released on DVD.

References 

1992 films
1990s English-language films
Troma Entertainment films
Films directed by James Merendino
American horror films
American sequel films
1990s American films